Canadia-Slovenia relations are foreign relations between the Canada and Slovenia.  Canada recognized Slovenian independence in January 1992, and established diplomatic relations a year later.  Canada is represented through its embassy in Budapest, Hungary, and through a consulate in Ljubljana.  Slovenia has an embassy in Ottawa and a general consulate in Toronto.  Both countries are full members of NATO.
There are 40,470 Slovenes who live in Canada as of the 2016 Canada Census.

State visits
Michaëlle Jean, Governor General of Canada made a visit to Slovenia in October 2009.

See also 
 Foreign relations of Canada
 Foreign relations of Slovenia
 Slovene Canadians
 Canada–Yugoslavia relations

References

External links 
   Canadian Ministry of Foreign Affairs and International Trade about relations with Slovenia
   Slovenian embassy in Ottawa

 
Slovenia
Bilateral relations of Slovenia